The 1994 Women's Hockey World Cup was the ninth staging of the Women's Hockey World Cup field hockey tournament, held from 13 to 23 July 1994 in Dublin, Ireland. Australia won, defeating Argentina 2–0 in the final. The host team, Ireland, finished 11th.

Qualification

Results

Preliminary round

Pool A

Pool B

Classification round

Ninth to twelfth place classification

Crossover

Eleventh and twelfth place

Ninth and tenth place

Fifth to eighth place classification

Crossover

Seventh and eighth place

Fifth and sixth place

First to fourth place classification

Semi-finals

Third and fourth place

Final

Statistics

Final standings

Goalscorers

References

External links
Official FIH website

1994
World Cup
1994 in Irish women's sport
World Cup
International sports competitions hosted by University College Dublin
July 1994 sports events in Europe
1990s in Dublin (city)